Hillcrest Christian College is an independent Christian school located in Reedy Creek, Gold Coast, Queensland, Australia.

The medium-size, co-educational, Christian school has approximately 1500 students enrolled in each semester with students ranging from Pre-Prep to Year 13. There is also an on-campus Kindy and Outside School Hours Care. 
Hillcrest Christian College is a member of the CSA (Christian Schools Organisation), which defines the school as a locally governed and not-for-profit organisation.

History

Hillcrest Christian College (previously named Southern Gold Coast Christian Community School) was opened by Reedy Creek Baptist Church (previously named Palm Beach Baptist Church) in 1982. Starting with just 37 students, ranging from years 1–7, the school operated on the Church grounds before moved to Reedy Creek in 1986.

The school has had four principals since its opening:
 Andrew Mackie (Founding Principal): 1982–1990
 Stuarte Kerdel: 1991–2001
 Keith Francis: 2002–2014
 Jeff Davis: 2015–current

In 2021 Hillcrest will introduce a Middle Learning Community which will create four distinct learning areas: Kindy, Junior, Middle and Senior Learning Communities.

Academia

NAPLAN Results

Hillcrest Christian College has a reputation for students performing well above State and National benchmarks in the Years 3, 5, 7 & 9 NAPLAN (National Assessment Program – Literacy and Numeracy) tests.

Year 3
2013 results indicate that:
 100% of Year 3 students achieved above the State and National average for numeracy, grammar, reading, spelling and writing.

Year 5
2013 results indicate that:
 97.1% of Year 5 students achieved above the State and National average for numeracy, grammar, reading and writing. 
 94.2% of student achieved above the State and National average for spelling.

Year 7
2013 results indicate that:
 98.6% of Year 7 students achieved above the State and National average for reading.
 97.3% of Year 7 students achieved above the State and National average for grammar, spelling and writing. 
 97.2% of Year 7 students achieved above the State and National average for numeracy.

Year 9
2013 results indicate that:
 98% of Year 9 students achieved above the State and National average for numeracy, reading and writing.
 97.1% of Year 9 students achieved above the State and National average for grammar.
 96.1% of Year 9 students achieved above the State and National average for spelling.

Year 12 Overall Position Results

The 2013 OP (Overall Position) results indicate that:
 98% of students in the 2013 cohort who applied for entrance to a university received an offer of place 
 71% of eligible students received an OP between 1 and 15

Partnerships with universities
Hillcrest Christian College has partnerships with Griffith University and Bond University. In 2013, 32% of Year 12 graduates completed vocational studies while in Year 12. In addition, five scholarships and guaranteed entries were awarded to students in 2013 to these universities.

Gifted & Talented
Hillcrest Christian College offers a dedicated Gifted & Talented program to cater for students who have been identified as significantly more advanced academically than their age group.

Hillcrest have four classes per year level but offer a dedicated composite Year3/4 class, a Year 5 and Year 6 classes called Lumos. Students in higher year levels are extended based on their subjective electives.

Technology
Hillcrest Christian College provide iPads for the Junior and for years 5–12 Hillcrest Christian College provides students with Surface Books through the One2One program.

International
International enrolments make up 6% of the total student population at Hillcrest Christian College.
The school implemented its International Student Program in 1996 and teaches English as a Second Language (ESL) to students currently speaking: 
 English
 Chinese 
 Japanese
 South Korean
 Taiwan(China)
 Hong Kong(China)

Co-curricular

Sport (HCC)
Hillcrest Christian College provides a range of sporting activities to all students including:

 Physical Education
 Aquatics Program
 Interschool Sport
 Outside School Hours Sport
 Interhouse Carnivals

Hillcrest run a very successful Basketball Excellence Program, which culminated in a 2016 senior boys state championship and a third-place finish in the national championships. The College also claimed the 2019 Junior Female AFL Schools Cup State Championship, coached by 251-game former AFL player Matthew Lappin.

Arts (HCC)
Hillcrest Christian College offers an array of options for students wanting to pursue performing arts including:
 Dance Academy
 Drama
 Choral Program
 Choral Excellence Program
 College Musical
 Instrumental

Student Leadership
Hillcrest Christian College has a leadership team for Early Years, Middle Years and Senior Years.

The senior team is chosen after the Year 11 Personal Development Program and Leadership Camp. The team consists of: 
 College Captains
 College Vice Captains
 Prefects 
 House Captains (one male & one female student for each house)
 International Student Captains
Additionally, two students from each year level are chosen to represent their peers in the Student Representative Council (SRC).

House system 
Hillcrest Christian College has four houses that each student represents in the swimming, cross country and athletics carnival. Each house is named after a Christian missionary throughout history.

Carmichael (Red)
Amy Carmichael (1867–1951) was a Protestant Christian missionary in India who opened an orphanage and founded a mission in Dohnavur. She worked mostly with young ladies, some of whom were saved from forced prostitution and wrote thirty-five published books.

Flynn (Blue)
John Flynn (1880–1951) was an Australian Presbyterian minister who founded the Royal Flying Doctor Service (the world's first air ambulance). After studying to at Ormond College in Melbourne, he was made the first superintendent of the Australian Inland Mission. Flynn quickly established the need for medical care for those living in the Australian outback and opened a number of hospitals in the bush.

Greene (Green)
Betty Greene (1920–1997) used her love for flying for Christian mission work after serving with the Women Air Force Service in World War II. She served for 16 years in 12 different countries until her death in 1997.

Taylor (Yellow)
Hudson Taylor (1832–1905) was a British Protestant Christian missionary to China and founder of the China Inland Mission. During his 51 years in China he was responsible for bringing over 800 missionaries to China who opened 125 schools. Taylor was able to preach in several varieties of Chinese, including Mandarin, Chaozhou and the Wu dialects of Shanghai and Ningbo. He used these talents to prepare a written edition of the New Testament.

Notable alumni

Entertainment
 Joe Davidson (Actor)
 James Fraser-Smith/Flashman (Professional wrestler)
 Apollo Jackson (Reality TV star)

Sport

References

External links
 Official School Website

Schools on the Gold Coast, Queensland
Private schools in Queensland
High schools in Queensland
Educational institutions established in 1982
1982 establishments in Australia